A number of Presbyterian and Reformed denominations exist in Australia.

List

Active

Notes:
 "Bible translation" column refers to versions of the Bible accepted. See also: King James Only movement
 "Singing" column refers to the manner in which songs are sung during public worship. See also: Exclusive psalmody

Defunct
 Free Presbyterian Church of Victoria, formerly the Free Presbyterian Church of Australia Felix, based in Melbourne 1846–1953 (joined Presbyterian Church of Eastern Australia)
 Free Presbyterian Church of South Australia, originated 1850, joined union which formed Presbyterian Church of South Australia in 1865, but minority led by Rev James Benny continued until the 1920s
 Free Church of Scotland (Continuing), one congregation in Adelaide, South Australia 2003–2010, now Gospel Presbyterian Church

Timeline

References

 
Presbyterian
Presbyterian, Australia
Lists of Christian denominations by region
Christian denominations in Australia